The Victory Shield 2007 was the 62nd edition of the Victory Shield, an annual football tournament competed for by the Under 16 level teams of England, Scotland, Northern Ireland and Wales. It was held from 5 October to 29 November 2007 and was won by England.

Venues

Final table

Matches and Results

Result

External links
Official Victory Shield website

2006
2007–08 in English football
2007–08 in Scottish football
2007–08 in Welsh football
2007–08 in Northern Ireland association football
October 2007 sports events in the United Kingdom
November 2007 sports events in the United Kingdom